The Nyingwom or Kam language is a Niger-Congo language spoken in eastern Nigeria. Blench (2019) lists speakers residing in the main villages of Mayo Kam and Kamajim in Bali LGA, Taraba State. Lesage reports that Kam is spoken in 27 villages of Bali LGA. 

Nyingwom was labeled as branch "G8" in Joseph Greenberg's Adamawa language family proposal. The precise classification of Kam is a matter of current research.

Speakers refer to themselves and their language as Nyí ŋwɔ̀m. Kamajim (Kam: àngwɔ́g ɲí 'house of the people') is the traditional capital of the Kam at the western foothills of a mountain range situated to the north of the Kam River. The Kam have historically been in extensive contact with the Kororofa Jukun.

Distribution
Kam or Nyingwom is spoken by approximately fewer than 5,000 speakers in the settlements of:
Sarkin Dawa (70)
Mayo Kam (150)
Garin Hamza (700)
Din Kamaajin A, B, C, D (3,000)
Garin Laa (300)
Garin Bandari (300)

However, Jakob Lesage estimates 20,000-25,000 speakers in 27 villages in May 2017.

Unlike many other Niger-Congo languages, Kam does not have a noun class system.

Further reading
Lesage, Jakob. 2019. Selected Kam documentation (with audio). Pangloss Collection: An archive for endangered languages.
Meek, Charles K. 1931. Tribal Studies in Northern Nigeria, Vol. 2. London: Kegan Paul, Trench, Trubner & Co., Ltd.

References

External links
Kam, by Jakob Lesage. AdaGram.

Waja languages
Languages of Nigeria